Doron Gepner (born March 31, 1956) is an Israeli theoretical physicist.
He made important contributions to the study of  string theory, two-dimensional conformal field theory, and integrable models.

Birth and education
Gepner was born in Philadelphia to Israeli parents.  He studied mathematics at Technion, Haifa (B. Sc., 1976) and theoretical physics at the Weizmann Institute, Rehovot (Ph.D., 1985), where his graduate advisor was Yitzhak Frishman. His early work focused on non-perturbative quantum field theory in two space-time dimensions.

Research
In 1985–1987 Gepner was a postdoctoral researcher at Princeton University. He made important contributions to the study of Rational Conformal Field Theory with extended chiral algebras. He also pioneered the use of methods of conformal field theory to study compactifications of superstring and heterotic string on Calabi–Yau manifolds. He introduced exactly solvable examples of such compactifications now known as Gepner models. This was an important step in establishing that superstrings and heterotic strings have a landscape of consistent vacua. Later he held research and teaching positions at Princeton University (1987-1989), Weizmann Institute (1989-1993) and California Institute of Technology (1992-1994). Since 1993 he has been an associate professor at the Weizmann Institute. Gepner's later work centered on Rational Conformal Field Theory and its relation with 2D integrable models. Gepner also made notable contributions to the theory of partitions in number theory, finding deep generalizations and analogs of the
Rogers–Ramanujan identities.

Students
 Ron Cohen
 Anton Kapustin
 Ernest Baver
 Boris Gotkin
 Umut Gursoy
 Boris Noyvert
 Joseph Conlon
 Sheshansu Pal
 Barak Haim
 Genish Arel

References

External links
 http://www.weizmann.ac.il/particle/content/doron-gepner 
 "Doron Gepner", Google Scholar

Israeli physicists
Princeton University faculty
1956 births
Living people
String theorists
Theoretical physicists